The Agriculture and Fisheries Council (AGRIFISH) is one of the configurations of the Council of the European Union and is composed of the agriculture and fisheries ministers of the 27 European Union member states. Its competencies include the Common Agricultural Policy (CAP) and the Common Fisheries Policy (CFP), among others.

Composition
Agrifish is composed of the agriculture and fisheries ministers of the 27 European Union member states. While most member states send one minister for both sectors, others send one minister for agriculture and another for fisheries.

The European Commissioner for Agriculture and Rural Development and the European Commissioner for Maritime Affairs and Fisheries also participate in the meetings.

Tasks
The agriculture part of the Council covers legislation relating to:

 the Common Agricultural Policy (CAP);
 internal market rules;
 forestry;
 organic production;
 quality of production and food and feed safety; and
 harmonisation of rules concerning veterinary matters, animal welfare, plant health, animal feed, seeds and pesticides.

The fisheries part of the Council covers legislation relating to:

 the Common Fisheries Policy (CFP);
 fisheries;
 the setting of annual Total Allowable Catches (TACs);
 quotas for each species; and
 fishing effort limits.

Legislative procedure
Since the entry into force of the Lisbon Treaty, the Council takes its decisions on most agriculture and fisheries legislation in co-decision with the European Parliament according to the ordinary legislative procedure, except with respect to decisions on annual fishing opportunities where the Council decides on its own.

Administration
The work and tasks of the Council concerning agriculture is prepared by the Special Committee on Agriculture (SCA), composed of senior agriculture officials from the member states and European Commission. The work and tasks of the Council concerning fisheries is prepared by the Committee of Permanent Representatives (COREPER), composed of fisheries experts from the member states and European Commission.

Within the Council Secretariat, the work and tasks of the Council is prepared by the Directorate-General for Agriculture, Fisheries, Social Affairs and Health.

See also
 European Parliament Committee on Agriculture and Rural Development
 European Parliament Committee on Fisheries
 European Commissioner for Agriculture and Rural Development
 Directorate-General for Agriculture and Rural Development
 European Commissioner for Maritime Affairs and Fisheries
 Directorate-General for Maritime Affairs and Fisheries
 Community Plant Variety Office
 European Food Safety Authority
 European Fisheries Control Agency

References

External links
About the Agriculture and Fisheries Council 
Press releases of the Agriculture and Fisheries Council

Council of the European Union
European Union fishing regulations
European Union and agriculture